This article details the Weightlifting at the 2012 Summer Olympics qualifying phase.

The Weightlifting competition at the 2012 Games includes 260 athletes. Each competing nation is allowed to enter a maximum of 10 competitors, 6 men and 4 women. 2010 and 2011 World Weightlifting Championships are the main qualifying events for the 2012 Olympic games. NOCs achieve qualification places according to their position in the joint team classification by points adding those scored in the 2010 and 2011 World Championships. One continental qualification event is held for each continent in 2012. Only NOCs which have not gained quota places in the Main Qualification Events may obtain quota places.

Great Britain, as host country has been allocated three men's quota places and two women's quota places for the London 2012 Olympic Games.

Qualification timeline 

Individual Ranking events

Qualification summary 

 Albania had 4 male quota places, but use only three. Therefore, one quota remained unused

Men

World Championships 
 Teams 1st–6th: 6 athletes
 Teams 7th–12th: 5 athletes
 Teams 13th–18th: 4 athletes
 Teams 19th–24th: 3 athletes

African Championships 
 Teams 1st–5th: 1 athlete

European Championships 
 Teams 1st–7th: 1 athlete

Asian Championships 
 Teams 1st–7th: 1 athlete

Pan-American Championships 
 Teams 1st–7th: 1 athlete

Oceania Championships 
 Teams 1st–5th: 1 athlete

Women

World Championships 
 Teams 1st–9th: 4 athletes
 Teams 10th–16th: 3 athletes
 Teams 17th–21st: 2 athletes

African Championships 
 Teams 1st–4th: 1 athlete

European Championships 
 Teams 1st–6th: 1 athlete

Asian Championships 
 Teams 1st–6th: 1 athlete

Pan-American Championships 
 Teams 1st–4th: 1 athlete

Oceania Championships 
 Teams 1st–4th: 1 athlete

Individual qualification
Eight places for men and seven places for women are allocated based on the Olympic Qualification Ranking Lists. Individual quota places are allocated to the athletes, ranked in the top 15 places for men and the top 10 places for women in each
bodyweight category, from NOCs which have not gained any quota place(s) through the Main or Continental Qualification Events.

Men

Women

Tripartite commission invitations

Men

Women

Reallocation of unused quota places

Men

Women

References 
General
 Qualification Summary

Specific

Qualification for the 2012 Summer Olympics